Geoffrey Bay is a bay with a large sweeping beach on Magnetic Island, Queensland, Australia. It is offshore from the suburb of Arcadia.

The wreck of the sailing barque the Moltke can be found in the bay.

References 

Geography of Townsville
Bays of Queensland